Jerry Schad (also known as Gerald Schad, November 3, 1949 – Sept. 22, 2011) was an American educator and nonfiction writer, who had extensively documented local hiking trails in San Diego, Orange County and Southern California.

His book Afoot & Afield San Diego County is widely considered the local bible of hiking.

Jerry Schad Observatory was dedicated by San Diego Mesa College on the rooftop of the Math and Science building of the community college.  Jerry Schad Memorial Trail was dedicated at Balboa Park in honor of him.

References

1949 births
2011 deaths
American non-fiction writers
San Diego Mesa College faculty